The 1992 California Angels season involved the Angels finishing 5th in the American League West with a record of 72 wins and 90 losses.

Offseason
December 8, 1991: Rubén Amaro, Jr. was traded by the California Angels with Kyle Abbott to the Philadelphia Phillies for Von Hayes.
 December 10, 1991: Hubie Brooks was traded by the New York Mets to the California Angels for Dave Gallagher.
January 17, 1992: Dick Schofield was signed as a free agent with the California Angels.
January 22, 1992: Bert Blyleven signed as a free agent with the California Angels.
January 27, 1992: Terry McGriff was signed as a free agent with the California Angels.
March 25, 1992: Shawn Abner was released by the California Angels.

Regular season
On May 19, 1992, Bobby Rose hit a home run in the last at-bat of his career.

Season standings

Record vs. opponents

Roster

Transactions
April 3, 1992: Terry McGriff was released by the California Angels.
April 12, 1992: Dick Schofield was traded by the California Angels with a player to be named later to the New York Mets for Julio Valera. The California Angels sent Julian Vasquez (minors) (October 6, 1992) to the New York Mets to complete the trade.
July 30, 1992: Mark Eichhorn was traded by the California Angels to the Toronto Blue Jays for Rob Ducey and Greg Myers.
August 21, 1992: Von Hayes was released by the California Angels.

Player stats

Batting

Starters by position
Note: Pos = Position; G = Games played; AB = At bats; H = Hits; Avg. = Batting average; HR = Home runs; RBI = Runs batted in

Other batters
Note: G = Games played; AB = At bats; H = Hits; Avg. = Batting average; HR = Home runs; RBI = Runs batted in

Pitching

Starting pitchers
Note: G = Games pitched; IP = Innings pitched; W = Wins; L = Losses; ERA = Earned run average; SO = Strikeouts

Other pitchers
Note: G = Games pitched; IP = Innings pitched; W = Wins; L = Losses; ERA = Earned run average; SO = Strikeouts

Relief pitchers
Note: G = Games pitched; W = Wins; L = Losses; SV = Saves; ERA = Earned run average; SO = Strikeouts

Farm system

References

1992 California Angels at Baseball Reference
1992 California Angels  at Baseball Almanac

Los Angeles Angels seasons
Los
Los